Huambo Airport  is a public use airport near the eastern edge of the city of Huambo in Huambo Province, Angola.

In a May 2016 aerial image, the coordinates show a narrow dirt road over-arched in several places by trees.

Accidents and incidents 
On 19 January 2008, a Gira Globo Aeronáutica Beechcraft B200 Super King Air on approach to Huambo Airport crashed on a mountain near Bailundo, killing all 13 people on board.

See also

 List of airports in Angola
 Transport in Angola

References 

Airports in Angola